Urney may refer to:

Urney, County Cavan, a civil parish and townland in County Cavan, Ireland
Urney, County Donegal, a civil parish in County Donegal, Ireland
Urney, a townland in County Offaly, Ireland
Urney, County Tyrone, a civil parish and townland in County Tyrone, Northern Ireland